The Seattle Sounders FC has had two managers since the team’s inaugural 2009 season in Major League Soccer.
The current manager is Brian Schmetzer, who was named as caretaker manager in July 2016 after the departure of Sigi Schmid. Schmetzer, elevated from his position as assistant coach. He previously managed the club in the USL First Division and played for the NASL franchise in the 1980s. Schmetzer was named permanent head coach in November 2016, ahead of the team's first MLS Cup championship.

Managers

This list includes all those who have managed the club since 2009, when the club joined Major League Soccer for the first time, whether managing on a full-time or caretaker basis. Games played include all League, Cup, Playoff, and Continental matches, and the win percentage is calculated from the total of games.

MP = Matches played; W = Matches won; L = Matches lost; D = Matches drawn; GF = Goals for; GA = Goals against; . Only includes MLS records. See Major League Soccer records and statistics.

1Win% is rounded to two decimal places.

Records

Honors

Most games managed

Earlier managers
The table lists managers since Seattle Sounders's election to Major League Soccer during it time in the North American Soccer League. It also includes the American Professional Soccer League and the USL First Division which took place between 1994 and 2008:

  John Best (1974-1976)
  Jimmy Gabriel (1977–1979)
  Alan Hinton (1980–1982 and 1994–1995)
  Laurie Calloway (1983)
  Neil Megson (1996–2000)
  Bernie James (2001)
  Brian Schmetzer (2002–2008)

Assistant Managers
Since the 2009 season, five assistant managers have been with the club:

  Brian Schmetzer (2008–2016)
  Ezra Hendrickson (2009–2015)
  Ante Razov (2015–present)
  Djimi Traoré (2016–present)

Current Coaching staff
{|class="wikitable"
!Position
!Staff
!Since
|-
|General Manager and President of Soccer||| Garth Lagerwey||January 6, 2015
|-
|Head Coach|| Brian Schmetzer||July 26, 2016
|-
|Sporting  Director||| Craig Waibel||
|-
|Assistant Coach|| Ante Razov||January 22, 2015
|-
|Assistant Coach|| ||March 2016
|-
|Goalkeeper Coach|| Tom Dutra||December 29, 2008
|-
|Fitness Coach|| David Tenney||January 9, 2009
|-
|Fitness Coach|| Chad Kolarcik||January 2012
|-
|Head Scout||vacant||December 2017
|-

See also
Seattle Sounders (1974–1983)
Seattle Sounders (1994–2008)

References

 
Lists of association football managers
managers